Shereka Monique Wright (born September 21, 1981) is an American basketball player and coach.

Career
She is the head coach at UT Arlington. Wright retired from competitive basketball in 2006 and has worked as an assistant coach since, at Texas Tech, Alabama, and Vanderbilt.

Wright was selected with the 13th overall pick in the 2004 WNBA Draft by the Detroit Shock. She appeared in 49 games over two seasons for the Phoenix Mercury and averaged 3.1 points and 1.6 rebounds over 12 minutes per game. She retired after missing the 2006 season with a torn achilles tendon.

Purdue statistics 

Source

References

External links
Purdue Boilermakers bio

1981 births
Living people
American women's basketball coaches
American women's basketball players
Alabama Crimson Tide women's basketball coaches
All-American college women's basketball players
Parade High School All-Americans (girls' basketball)
Phoenix Mercury players
Purdue Boilermakers women's basketball players
Texas Tech Lady Raiders basketball coaches
UT Arlington Mavericks women's basketball coaches
Vanderbilt Commodores women's basketball coaches